Marguerite Louis Blasingame Charles (1906–1947) was an American sculptor and painter. Born Marguerite Louis in Honolulu in 1906, she graduated from the University of Hawaii and went on to earn an M.A. in fine art from Stanford University in 1928. The artist then returned to Hawaii, where she became an established sculptor of figural works, many of them bas-reliefs in wood and stone.  Her depictions were usually sinuous in contour with simplified anatomy.  During the Great Depression, Blasingame was a Works Progress Administration artist and filled many commissions for architectural panels.

Marguerite Blasingame founded the Hawaiian Mural Arts Guild in 1934, along with Isami Doi, Madge Tennent, and others.   She authored A Course in Art Appreciation for the Adult Layman, which was published by Stanford University Press. Blasingame died in 1947 while traveling in Mexico. She was survived by her second husband, Forrest Charles, and sons Pierre F. Charles and William Blasingame. On Saturday 15 March 1947, fellow island artist Madge Tennent published the following tribute to Blasingame in The Honolulu Advertiser:To her many artist friends she represented a youthful and indomitable vitality in art, which was supported by a capacity for grueling hard work in her chosen field of true fresco and sculptured bas-relief in Hawaiian wood and stone. She was, by almost any way of thinking, too young to die. But the strangely wonderful thing is this, that she has in her sadly short young life, left more important works of art which have been placed where everybody may enjoy them, than any other island artist.One of her wooden sculptures is installed in the John Dominis and Patches Damon Holt Gallery of the Honolulu Museum of Art. She made four wood carvings flanking the lectern and pulpit of Church of the Crossroads in 1935, symbolizing four great religious faiths: Zoroastrianism, Judaism, Hinduism and Buddhism.[5]   Other sculptures in public places includes an untitled 1935 marble sculpture in Ala Moana Park, Honolulu, Hawaii and Hawaiian Decagonal Fountain (1934–1935) at Kawananakoa School, Honolulu, Hawaii.

References
 Forbes, David W., "Encounters with Paradise: Views of Hawaii and its People, 1778-1941", Honolulu Academy of Arts, 1992, p. 213.
 Hemphill, Betty, "The Crossroads Witness", Church of the Crossroads, Honolulu, HI, 1988. 
 Papanikolas, Theresa and DeSoto Brown, Art Deco Hawai'i, Honolulu, Honolulu Museum of Art, 2014, pp. 60–64.
 Radford, Georgia and Warren Radford, "Sculpture in the Sun, Hawaii's Art for Open Spaces", University of Hawaii Press, 1978, pp. 91–92
 Sandulli, Justin M., Troubled Paradise: Madge Tennent at a Hawaiian Crossroads, Durham, NC: Duke University, 2016

Footnotes

American women sculptors
1906 births
1947 deaths
Works Progress Administration workers
Sculptors from Hawaii
20th-century American sculptors
20th-century American women artists
Painters from Hawaii
Symbolist artists
Women surrealist artists
American surrealist artists